Reinhard Sens is a former East German slalom canoeist who competed in the 1950s. He won a gold medal in the folding K-1 team event at the 1957 ICF Canoe Slalom World Championships in Augsburg.

References

German male canoeists
Possibly living people
Year of birth missing (living people)
Place of birth missing (living people)
Medalists at the ICF Canoe Slalom World Championships